Songs from the Ocean Floor is the third solo studio album by American rock artist Kip Winger. The album was released in 2001. According to Kip, the lead track "Cross" is an extremely personal song and he opens every solo show with it.

Track listing
 "Cross" (Kip Winger) – 4:51
 "Crash The Wall" (Winger, Noble Kime) – 3:31
 "Sure Was A Wildflower" (Winger) – 4:52
 "Two Lovers Stand" (Winger) – 4:22
 "Landslide" (Winger, Kime) – 5:14
 "Faster (Winger, Kime) – 2:50
 "Song Of Midnight" (Winger, Kime) – 4:49
 "Free" (Winger) – 3:47
 "Only One Word" (Winger) – 5:09
 "Broken Open" (Winger, Kime) – 5:39
 "Resurrection" (Winger, Kime) – 5:16
 "Everything You Need" (Winger) – 4:15
 "Headed For A Heartbreak" (Live) – 5:53 (Japanese Bonus Track)

Musicians
 Kip Winger – vocals, Steel-string guitar, bass guitar, keyboards
 Andy Timmons – guitars, ebow
 John Roth – guitars
 Rod Morgenstein – drums
 Ken Mary – drums
 Pat Mastelotto – drums
 Robby Rothschild – Percussion
 Mark Clark – Percussion
 Paula De Tuillio – backing vocals
 Frank Medina – backing vocals
 Moon Zappa – vocals on "Sure Was A Wildflower"
 Dweezil Zappa – Guitar
 Jonathan Arthur – vocals on "Landslide"
 Reb Beach – guitar solo on "Resurrection"
 David Felberg – violin
 Elena Sopoci – violin
 Joe Zoeckler – violin
 Anne Martin – viola
 Joan Zucker – cello
 Mark Tatum – double bass

Album credits
 Produced, engineered, arranged and mixed by Kip Winger
 Recorded at Rising Sun Studios, Santa Fe, 1998–1999
 Editing by Phil Jackson and Greg DeAngelo
 Mastered by Paul Blakemore
 Photography by Chris Corey
 Cover design by Pete Cotutsca

See also
Winger

References

External links
 Kip Winger official website

2001 albums
Albums produced by Kip Winger